This is a list of castles and fortresses declared historic monuments by Romania's Ministry of Culture.

Banat 
 Caraș-Severin (6)
 Bey's Fortress, Socolari
 Caransebeș Fortress, Caransebeș
 Cuiești Fortress, Bocșa
 Ladislau Fortress, Coronini
 Mehadia Fortress, Mehadia
 Turk's Fortress (Turski Grad), Carașova
 Timiș (10)

 Ciacova Fortress, Ciacova
 Făget Fortress, Făget
 Huniade Castle, Timișoara
 Jdioara Fortress, Jdioara
 Karátsonyi Castle, Banloc
 Margina Fortress, Margina
 Castle of Count de Mercy, Carani
 Morisena Fortress, Cenad
 Nákó Castle, Sânnicolau Mare
 Timișoara Fortress, Timișoara

Bukovina 

  Suceava (3)

 Șcheia Fortress, Suceava
 Princely Fortress, Suceava
 Seat Fortress of Suceava, Suceava

Crișana 
 Arad (22)

 Agrișu Mare Fortress, Agrișu Mare
 Arad Fortress, Arad
 Bohus Castle, Șiria
 Csernovics Castle, Macea
 Dezna Fortress, Dezna
 Hălmagiu Fortress, Hălmagiu
 Hindec Fortress, Covăsânț
 Ineu Fortress, Ineu
 Konopi Castle, Odvoș
 Kövér-Appel Castle, Fântânele
 Mocsonyi Castle, Bulci
 Nopcsa Castle, Arad
 Purgly Castle, Șofronea
 Royal Castle, Săvârșin
 Salbek Castle, Petriș
 Șiria Fortress, Șiria
 Șoimoș Fortress, Șoimoș
 Solymosy Castle, Mocrea
 Tauț Fortress, Tauț
 Teleki Castle, Căpâlnaș
 Tornea Fortress, Covăsânț
 Turkish Fortress, Pâncota

 Bihor (17)
 Adorján Fortress, Sălard
 Batthyány Castle, Aleșd
 Biharia Fortress, Biharia
 Castle-Former Premonstratensian Monastery, Sânmartin
 Csáky Castle, Marghita
 Degenfeld-Schonburg Castle, Balc
 Finiș Fortress, Finiș
 Hunting Castle of Poiana Florilor, Aleșd
 Kornis Fortress, Pomezeu
 Oradea Fortress, Oradea
 Piatra Șoimului Fortress, Peștiș
 Stubenberg Castle, Săcueni
 Thelegdy Castle, Tileagd
 Tholdy Castle, Sânnicolau Român
 Tisza Castle, Ghiorac
 Zichy Castle, Diosig
 Zichy Hunting Castle, Gheghie

Dobruja 
  Constanța (3)
 Hisarlık Fortress, Cetatea
 Karaharman Fortress, Vadu
 Vicina Fortress, Ostrov

  Tulcea (3)

 Enisala Fortress, Enisala
 Proslavița Fortress (Переяславецька фортеця), Nufăru
 Zaporozhians' Fortress, Dunavățu de Jos

Maramureș 
  Maramureș (7)
 Apafi Castle, Coștiui
 Blomberg Castle, Gârdani
 Chioar Fortress (Kővár vára), Berchezoaia
 Seini Fortress, Seini
 Teleki Castle, Coltău
 Teleki Castle, Pribilești
 Teleki Castle, Satulung

  Satu Mare (6)

 Cserey-Fischer Castle, Tășnad
 Károlyi Castle, Carei
 Károlyi Fortress, Ardud
 Lónyai Castle, Medieșu Aurit
 Perényi Castle, Turulung
 Vécsey Castle, Livada

Moldavia 
  Bacău (2)

 Cantacuzino-Pașcanu-Waldenburg Castle, Lilieci
 Ghica Castle, Dofteana

  Iași (1)

 Sturdza Castle, Miclăușeni

  Neamț (3)
 Mușat Fortress of Roman, Roman
 Neamț Fortress, Târgu Neamț
 New Fortress of Roman, Gâdinți

  Vrancea (2)
 Crăciuna Fortress, Câmpineanca
 Sihleanu-Grădișteanu-Ghica Castle, Sihlea

Muntenia 
  Argeș (2)

 Oratea Fortress, Podu Dâmboviței
 Poenari Fortress, Căpățânenii Ungureni

  Brăila (1)
 Brăila Fortress, Brăila

  Dâmbovița (1)

 Târgoviște Fortress, Târgoviște

  Giurgiu (1)
 Giurgiu Fortress, Giurgiu

  Prahova (8)

 Cantacuzino Castle, Bușteni
 Foișor Castle, Sinaia
 Iulia Hasdeu Castle, Câmpina
 Peleș Castle, Sinaia
 Pelișor Castle, Sinaia
 Posada (Bibescu) Castle, Comarnic
 Tabla Buții Fortress, Slon
 Văcărescu-Callimachi Castle, Mănești

  Teleorman (2)
 Cossacks' Fortress, Roșiorii de Vede
 Turnu Fortress (Крепост Холъвник), Turnu Măgurele

Oltenia 
  Mehedinți (4)
 Ada Kaleh Fortress (Adakale), Șimian
 Grădeț Fortress, Balotești
 Severin Fortress, Drobeta-Turnu Severin
 Trikule Fortress, Svinița

  Vâlcea (1)
 Strassburg (Arxavia) Fortress, Câinenii Mari

Transylvania 
  Alba (20)

 Aiud Fortress, Aiud
 Alba Carolina Fortress, Alba Iulia
 Bánffy Castle, Sâncrai
 Bethlen Castle, Aiud
 Bethlen Castle, Sânmiclăuș
 Bethlen-Haller Castle, Cetatea de Baltă
 Colțești Fortress, Colțești
 Diód Fortress, Stremț
 Esterházy Castle, Șard
 Giants' Fortress, Gârbova
 Giants' Fortress, Glogoveț
 Gräven Fortress, Gârbova
 Martinuzzi Castle, Vințu de Jos
 Mikes Castle, Cisteiu de Mureș
 Peasants' Fortress (Bauernfestung Kelling), Câlnic
 Săsciori Fortress (Burg Schweis), Săsciori
 Tăuți Fortress, Tăuți
 Teleki Castle, Uioara de Sus
 Wesselényi Castle, Obreja
 Zebernic Fortress, Valea Vințului

  Bistrița-Năsăud (16)
 András Bethlen Castle, Beclean
 Bánffy Castle, Urmeniș
 Bethlen Castle, Arcalia
 Bethlen Castle, Cristur-Șieu
 Bistrița Fortress, Bistrița
 Ciceu Fortress, Ciceu-Corabia
 Haller Castle, Matei
 Hye Castle, Ilișua
 Károly Castle, Dobric
 Lázár Castle, Sărata
 Pál Bethlen Castle, Beclean
 Rákóczi Castle, Șieu
 Teleki Castle, Comlod
 Teleki Castle, Posmuș
 Torma Castle, Cristeștii Ciceului
 Wesselényi Hunting Castle, Chiochiș

  Brașov (20)

 László Béldi Castle, Budila
 Bran Castle (Törzburg), Bran
 Brâncoveanu Castle, Sâmbăta de Sus
 Brașov Fortress, Brașov
 Brukenthal Castle, Sâmbăta de Jos
 Făgăraș Castle, Făgăraș
 Feldioara Fortress (Marienburg), Feldioara
 Fortress on Strajă, Brașov
 Guthman-Valenta Castle, Hoghiz
 Haller Castle, Hoghiz
 Heldenburg Fortress, Crizbav
 Jimbor Fortress, Jimbor
 Kálnoky Castle, Hoghiz
 Mikes Castle, Budila
 Negru Vodă Fortress, Breaza
 Nemes Castle, Budila
 Pál Béldi Castle, Budila
 Râșnov Fortress (Burg Rosenau), Râșnov
 Rupea Fortress (Burg Reps), Rupea
 Sükösd-Bethlen Castle, Racoș

  Cluj (25)

 Bánffy Castle, Bonțida
 Bánffy Castle, Borșa
 Bánffy Castle, Răscruci
 Béldi Castle, Geaca
 Bocskai Castle, Aghireșu
 Bologa Fortress (Sebesvár), Bologa
 Dăbâca Fortress, Dăbâca
 Dej Fortress, Dej
 Géczy Fortress, Liteni
 Haller Castle, Coplean
 Jósika Castle, Moldovenești
 Kemény Castle, Luncani
 Kornis Castle, Mănăstirea
 Lita Fortress, Săcel
 Maiden's Fortress (Leányvár), Florești
 Maiden's Fortress, Mihai Viteazu
 Martinuzzi Fortress, Gherla
 Mikes Castle, Săvădisla
 Teleki Castle, Luna de Jos
 Turda Fortress, Turda
 Unguraș Fortress, Unguraș
 Veres Castle, Pruniș
 Wass Castle, Țaga
 Wass-Bánffy Castle, Gilău
 Wolves' Fortress (Farkasvár), Bicălatu

  Covasna (24)
 Almaș Fortress, Lemnia
 Apor Castle, Turia
 Badger's Fortress (Borzvára), Boroșneu Mic
 Bálványos Fortress, Turia
 Béldi-Mikes Castle, Ozun
 Csuklyán Fortress, Lutoasa
 Dániel Castle, Tălișoara
 Dániel Castle, Vârghiș
 Falcons' Fortress, Bixad
 Ika Fortress, Cernat
 Kálnoky Castle, Micloșoara
 Kálnoky Castle, Valea Crișului
 Maiden's Fortress (Leánykavár), Olteni
 Mikes Castle, Zăbala
 Mikó Castle, Olteni
 Nemes Castle, Hăghig
 Rákóczi Fortress, Oituz
 Rika Fortress, Racoșu de Sus
 Sfântu Gheorghe Fortress, Sfântu Gheorghe
 Szentkereszty Castle, Arcuș
 Thury-Bányai Castle, Tamașfalău
 Tiborc Fortress, Biborțeni
 Turia Fortress (Torjávara), Turia
 Vápa Fortress, Bixad

  Harghita (17)

 Bágy Fortress, Bădeni
 Bothvár Fortress, Gheorgheni
 Budvár Fortress, Odorheiu Secuiesc
 Ciceu Fortress, Ciceu
 Firtos Fortress, Corund
 Harom Fortress, Miercurea Ciuc
 Kustaly Fortress, Ocland
 Lázár Castle, Lăzarea
 Little Fortress (Kisvár), Miercurea Ciuc
 Mikó Fortress, Miercurea Ciuc
 Pagans' Fortress (Pogányvár), Racu
 Poppy's Fortress (Mákvára), Dealu
 Rapsóné Fortress, Praid
 Salt Fortress (Sóvár), Miercurea Ciuc
 Székelytámadt Fortress, Odorheiu Secuiesc
 Tartód Fortress, Vărșag
 Tușnad Fortress, Tușnad

  Hunedoara (17)

 Bethlen Castle, Deva
 Corvin Castle, Hunedoara
 Deva Fortress, Deva
 Fáy Castle, Simeria
 Gyulay Castle, Mintia
 Jósika Castle, Brănișca
 Kendeffy Castle, Sântămăria-Orlea
 Knezial Fortress of the Kendeffys, Suseni
 Mălăiești Fortress, Mălăiești
 Naláczy-Fáy Castle, Nălațvad
 Nopcsa Castle, Săcel
 Nopcsa Castle, Zam
 Orăștie Fortress (Burg Broos), Orăștie
 Pogány Castle, Păclișa
 Răchitova Fortress, Răchitova
 Royal Fortress of Hațeg, Subcetate
 Veres Castle, Bobâlna

  Mureș (33)

 Apor Castle, Abuș
 Bánffy Castle, Gheja
 Bethlen Castle, Bahnea
 Bethlen Castle, Boiu
 Bethlen Castle, Criș
 Bethlen Castle, Mădăraș
 Bethlen Castle, Țopa
 Bornemisza Castle, Gurghiu
 Csombod Fortress, Sărățeni
 Degenfeld Castle, Cuci
 Gurghiu Fortress, Gurghiu
 Haller Castle, Mihai Viteazu
 Haller Castle, Ogra
 Haller Castle, Sânpaul
 Huszár Castle, Apalina
 Kacsó Fortress, Măgherani
 Kendi-Kemény Castle, Brâncovenești
 Kornis-Rákóczi-Bethlen Castle, Iernut
 Maka Fortress, Ghindari
 Máriaffi Castle, Sângeorgiu de Mureș
 Peasants' Fortress (Hünenburg), Saschiz
 Pekri Castle, Ozd
 Rhédey Castle, Sângeorgiu de Pădure
 Rhédey-Rothental Castle, Seuca
 Royal Hunting Castle, Lăpușna
 Sighișoara Fortress (Schässburg), Sighișoara
 Somsics Castle, Chendu
 Târgu Mureș Fortress, Târgu Mureș
 Teleki Castle, Dumbrăvioara
 Teleki Castle, Gornești
 Tholdalagi Castle, Corunca
 Ugron Castle, Zau de Câmpie
 Vityál Fortress, Eremitu

  Sălaj (13)

 Aranyos Fortress, Cheud
 Bánffy Castle, Nușfalău
 Báthory Fortress, Șimleu Silvaniei
 Béldi Castle, Jibou
 Bethlen Castle, Dragu
 Crow's Fortress (Várjuvár), Stana
 Csáky Castle, Almașu
 Dezső Fortress, Almașu
 Haller Castle, Gârbou
 Jósika Castle, Surduc
 Thököly Fortress, Cehu Silvaniei
 Valcău Fortress, Subcetate
 Wesselényi Castle, Jibou

  Sibiu (11)

 Apafi Castle, Dumbrăveni
 Bolyai Castle, Buia
 Brukenthal Castle, Avrig
 Brukenthal Castle, Micăsasa
 Cisnădioara Fortress (Burg Michelsberg), Cisnădioara
 Salgo Fortress, Sibiel
 Sibiu Fortress, Sibiu
 Slimnic Fortress (Stolzenburg), Slimnic
 Tilișca Fortress, Tilișca
 Tobias Castle, Boarta
 Turnu Roșu Castle, Boița

See also 
List of castles
List of fortications in Wallachia
Villages with fortified churches in Transylvania

References

Additional reading

External links

 Monumente Uitate
 Castel în Transilvania

 
Romania
Lists of buildings and structures in Romania
Tourism in Romania
Romania
Castles